The 1994 Japanese Grand Prix (officially the XX Fuji Television Japanese Grand Prix) was a Formula One motor race held on 6 November 1994 at the Suzuka Circuit, Suzuka. It was the fifteenth and penultimate race of the 1994 Formula One World Championship. In wet conditions, the 50-lap race was won by Damon Hill, driving a Williams-Renault, after he started from second position. Hill's Drivers' Championship rival Michael Schumacher finished second in his Benetton-Ford, having started from pole position, with Jean Alesi third in his Ferrari. The win left Hill just one point behind Schumacher in the Drivers' Championship with one race remaining. This also proved to be the last Grand Prix for Érik Comas. This was also the last time in Formula 1 history when the race was split in two parts due to race stoppage and final classification has been set by aggregate time.

Report
Going into the race, Benetton driver Michael Schumacher led the Drivers' Championship with 86 points, five ahead of rival Damon Hill in the Williams on 81. Schumacher felt he was "very confident" about the race, and Hill similarly declared that he was "positive".

There were several changes of driver for this race: Johnny Herbert moved from Ligier to Benetton after just one race for the French team, replacing Jos Verstappen. His place at Ligier was taken by Franck Lagorce. Eric Bernard lost his seat at Lotus to Mika Salo who had been racing in Japanese Formula 3000, and likewise Simtek hired Taki Inoue on a one-race deal, replacing Domenico Schiattarella. Finally, JJ Lehto returned to Sauber to replace Andrea de Cesaris after the Italian's sudden retirement from Formula One.

The race started in torrential rain, and as a result, several cars spun out of the race by aquaplaning, including Schumacher's team-mate Herbert on lap 4, Lagorce, the Minardis of Pierluigi Martini and Michele Alboreto, and all three Japanese drivers by the end of lap 3 (with both Ukyo Katayama and Hideki Noda being injured in separate crashes). Lehto also retired at the start with an engine failure. As did Gerhard Berger in the second Ferrari with battery problems by lap 11.

On lap 13, Gianni Morbidelli crashed his Footwork at one of the Esses at the first sector. Shortly afterwards, Martin Brundle spun his McLaren off the track and crashed at the same spot, and as he bounced off the tyre barriers, hit a track marshal who was moving Morbidelli's car off the gravel trap. The marshal suffered a broken leg, adding to the huge list of injuries of the 1994 season, and the race was immediately stopped, as both Brundle and Morbidelli were fortunately able to escape uninjured. Rubens Barrichello soon retired in the pits with transmission problems by lap 17, Blundell was also forced to retire from 10th position when his engine failed on lap 27, which ended an appalling weekend for Tyrrell. This left 13 runners, and there were no further retirements for the remaining 23 laps.

As the rain eased, it was decided to run the remainder of the race, with around one hour to the time limit, on aggregate corrected time. Schumacher had been leading by 6.8 seconds when the red flag was shown, but Hill had a bigger lead (10.1 seconds) at the chequered flag, and thus took the win by 3.3 seconds on aggregate. This remains the last instance of aggregate race time being used in Formula One to determine the winner.

Classification

Qualifying

Race

Championship standings after the race

Drivers' Championship standings

Constructors' Championship standings

References

Japanese Grand Prix
Japanese Grand Prix
Grand Prix
Japanese Grand Prix